The 2007–08 Regionalliga season was the 14th season of the Regionalliga at tier three of the German football league system. It was contested in two geographical divisions with eighteen teams in the south and nineteen in the north. The champions, Rot Weiss Ahlen and FSV Frankfurt, and the runners-up, Rot-Weiß Oberhausen and FC Ingolstadt 04, of every division were promoted to the 2. Bundesliga.

With the introduction of the 3. Liga for the 2008–09 season, 2007–08 was the final season of the Regionalliga as the third tier of German football. Qualification for the new league was determined through this 2007–08 season's 2. Bundesliga and the Regionalliga. Because of the introduction of the 3. Liga above and a third regional division of the Regionalliga, the Regionalliga West, only one club was relegated from the league after declaring insolvency.

North

Table

Results

South

Table

Results

References

External links
 Regionalliga at the German Football Association 
 Regionalliga Nord 2007–08 at kicker.de
 Regionalliga Süd 2007–08 at kicker.de

Regionalliga seasons
3
Germ